Se solicita muchacha de buena presencia y motorizado con moto propia is a 1977 film directed by Venezuelan director Alfredo Anzola.

Cast

References

External links 

 
 Se solicita muchacha de buena presencia y motorizado con moto propia in Film Affinity

1977 films
Venezuelan drama films
1970s Spanish-language films